Lohusuu Parish was an Estonian municipality located in Ida-Viru County. It had a population of 818  (2006) and an area of 102 km².

 Small borough
Lohusuu

 Villages
Jõemetsa - Kalmaküla - Kärasi - Ninasi - Piilsi - Raadna - Separa - Tammispää - Vilusi

References

External links 
 Official website 

Former municipalities of Estonia